The  San Antonio Talons season was the 12th season for the franchise, and the third in the Arena Football League. This was the first season for the Talons in San Antonio, Texas after relocating from Tulsa, Oklahoma following the 2011 season. The team was coached by Lee Johnson and played their home games at the Alamodome. The Talons finished the regular season with a 14–4 record, winning the Central Division and securing the top seed in the National Conference. However, the Talons would lose at home by one point in the conference semifinals to the Utah Blaze, 34–35.

Standings

Schedule

Regular season
The Talons began the season at home against the Utah Blaze on March 10. They went on the road to play the Iowa Barnstormers on July 21 in their final regular season game.

Playoffs

Final roster

References

Tulsa Talons
San Antonio Talons seasons